The 1983 FIS Freestyle Skiing World Cup was the fourth World Cup season in freestyle skiing organised by International Ski Federation. The season started on 4 January 1983 and ended on 19 March 1983. This season included four disciplines: aerials, moguls, ballet and combined.

Men

Ballet

Moguls

Aerials

Combined

Ladies

Ballet

Moguls

Aerials

Combined

Men's standings

Overall 

Standings after 25 races.

Moguls 

Standings after 6 races.

Aerials 

Standings after 6 races.

Ballet 

Standings after 7 races.

Combined 

Standings after 6 races.

Ladies' standings

Overall 

Standings after 25 races.

Moguls 

Standings after 6 races.

Aerials 

Standings after 6 races.

Ballet 

Standings after 7 races.

Combined 

Standings after 6 races.

References

FIS Freestyle Skiing World Cup
World Cup